John Hullier or Hulliarde, Huller or Hullyer,  (c. 1520 – 16 April 1556) was an English  clergyman and a Protestant martyr under Mary I of England.

He was a chorister in the Choir of King's College, Cambridge before attending Eton College and then returning to King's College, Cambridge as an undergraduate. He became vicar of Babraham, Cambridgeshire in 1549 until he was deprived in February 1556.

For his preaching in King's Lynn he was taken to Thomas Thirlby, Bishop of Ely, who sent him to Cambridge. Hullier was examined  on Palm Sunday eve 28 March before a body of divines and lawyers headed by Nicholas Shaxton, at Great St Mary's, Cambridge.

On Maundy Thursday, 16 April 1556 Hullier was burned at the stake on Jesus Green, Cambridge for refusing to renounce the Protestant faith.

References

Alumni of King's College, Cambridge
People executed for heresy
Executed British people
People executed under Mary I of England
1500s births
1556 deaths
Executed English people
16th-century Protestant martyrs
People executed by the Kingdom of England by burning
Protestant martyrs of England
People from Babraham
Choristers of the Choir of King's College, Cambridge
English Christian clergy